Dujiangyan is a county-level city of Sichuan Province, Southwest China, it is under the administration of the prefecture-level city of Chengdu. Its north-west region forms a border with southern Ngawa Tibetan and Qiang Autonomous Prefecture.

Dujiangyan was formerly a county named Guanxian or Guan County. The county became a county-level city in 1988 and was renamed after the Dujiangyan Irrigation System, in the city's northwest, famous for providing Chengdu with water for over two millennia, since around 250 BC.

History
Around 250 BC during the Warring States period, Li Bing, a governor of Shu (present Sichuan Province) in the Qin state with his son directed the construction of Dujiangyan. Li Bing gave up the old ways of dam building, which were simply directed at flood control, employing a new method of channeling and dividing the water of the Min River. He accomplished this by separating the project into two main parts: the headwork and the irrigation system.  The whole system has functioned for 2,000 years, preventing floods and providing substantial irrigation and facilitating shipping and wood drifting. It has contributed greatly to the richness of Chengdu Plain with its reputation as "The Land of Abundance".

On 12 May 2008, the city was the closest to the epicenter of the 2008 Sichuan earthquake and the city suffered severe damage. Xinjian Primary School, Juyuan Middle School, and Xiang'e Middle School collapsed in the earthquake.

Climate
Dujiangyan has a monsoon-influenced humid subtropical climate (Köppen Cwa) with cool, dry winters and hot, very wet summers.

Administrative divisions
Dujiangyan has 17 towns and two townships:
Towns:
Guankou
Xingfu
Puyang
Juyuan
Chongyi
Tianma
Shiyang
Liujie
Yutang
Zhongxing
Qingchengshan
Longchi
Xujia
Anlong
Daguan
Zipingpu
Cuiyuehu
Townships:
Xiang'e
Hongkou

Transport

China National Highway 317
Chengdu–Dujiangyan High-Speed Railway
Dujiangyan railway station

Sister cities
  Ōtake, Hiroshima, Japan

See also

Dujiangyan Irrigation System
Kuiguang Pagoda

Notes

References

External links

Official website of Dujiangyan Government

County-level cities in Sichuan
Geography of Chengdu